White bream virus is a species of virus.  It is the sole species in the subgenus Blicbavirus, which is in the genus Bafinivirus. It was first isolated from white bream (Blicca bjoerkna) in Germany. It is a bacilliform (rod-shaped) positive-sense single-stranded RNA virus.

References 

Nidovirales
Zoonoses